Fridlin is a surname. Notable people with the surname include:

Karl Fridlin (born 1935), Swiss swimmer
Semyon Fridlin (1909–1992), Moldovan/Soviet architect

Surnames of European origin